Balgheim is a municipality in the district of Tuttlingen in Baden-Württemberg in Germany.

Geography
Balgheim lies in a basin on the edge of the Baar at the foot of the Swabian Jura and the Dreifaltigkeitsberg (Holy Trinity Mountain).  The European Watershed, the divide between the Rhine and Danube watersheds, occurs in the town's territory.  The source of the Prim, which joins the Neckar (a tributary of the Rhine) in Rottweil, is located only a kilometer away from the source of the Faulenbach, an eventual tributary of the Danube, in neighboring Dürbheim.

Balgheim is bordered by Böttingen to the north, Dürbheim to the southeast, Rietheim-Weilheim to the south, and the city Spaichingen to the west.

History
Tombs dating from the Merovingian dynasty indicate that Balgheim was founded in the 6th or 7th century.  It was first mentioned in writing in 1113.  In 1420 it was sold to the Free Imperial City Rottweil, where it remained until 1689, after which its rule changed often until it became part of Württemberg in 1806.

Politics
Balgheim belongs to the Amt Spaichingen.

Transportation
The Bundesstraße 14 (federal highway) between Rottweil and Tuttlingen passes by the east edge of Balgheim.  The Plochingen–Immendingen railway passes over the European Watershed here.  On workdays the Ringzug (train) provides hourly connections to Rottweil, Tuttlingen and Geisingen-Leiferdingen.

References

Tuttlingen (district)
Württemberg